Jeremiah Manele (born 1968) was the Permanent Secretary of Foreign Affairs and External Trade in Solomon Islands until December 2007. He was elected as the Member of Parliament for the Hograno/Kia/Havulei constituency in the 2019 general election. He has become Minister of Foreign Affairs since 26 April 2019.

References

Living people
Members of the National Parliament of the Solomon Islands
1968 births
Foreign Ministers of the Solomon Islands